Angar may refer to:

Geography
 Angar, a village and a Gram Panchayat in Mohol, Maharashtra, India
 Angar, a railway station - see List of railway stations in India
 Angar-e Chaleh, also known as Angar, a village in Kerman Province, Iran
 Hanger River, also transliterated as Angar River, Ethiopia
 Angara (Buryat and Mongolian: Angar), a river in Siberia

Arts and entertainment
 Angar, a 1959 play by Utpal Dutt
 Angar the Screamer, Marvel Comics villain David A. Angar